Turris perkinsiana is an extinct species of sea snail, a marine gastropod mollusk in the family Turridae, the turrids.

Description
The length of the shell attains 15.2 mm; the maximum diameter is 3.81 mm; the aperture is about 6.3 mm long.

(Original description) The shell is very long and slender. It contains about ten rounded whorls. The first two are turbinate, smooth. The third shows ten or twelve close-set vertical riblets, crossed by eight or ten revolving ones, the vertical gradually increasing to twenty-six on the body whorl, forming a close beaded sculpture as far as the middle of body-whorl, while the revolving ribs continue alone on the body to the siphonal canal. It varies also in relative strength of the two series of riblets, at different portions of the spire. The sinus is close to the suture The siphonal canal is straight. The  columella is simple.

Distribution
Fossils of this marine species were found in Eocene strata in California, USA (age range: 55.8 to 48.6 Ma)

References

 R. E. Dickerson. 1916. Stratigraphy and fauna of the Tejon Eocene of California. University of California Publications Bulletin of the Department of Geology 9(17):363-524

perkinsiana
Gastropods described in 1894